Lee June-seo (born 3 June 2000) is a South Korean short track speed skater.

He participated at the 2019 World Short Track Speed Skating Championships, winning a medal. He also competed in 2022 Beijing Winter Olympics, 500 m, 1000 m, 1500 m and 5000 m relay by won silver medal for the latter.

Filmography

Television show

References

External links

1988 births
Living people
Four Continents Short Track Speed Skating Championships medalists
Medalists at the 2022 Winter Olympics
Olympic short track speed skaters of South Korea
Olympic silver medalists for South Korea
Olympic medalists in short track speed skating
Short track speed skaters at the 2022 Winter Olympics
South Korean male short track speed skaters
Sportspeople from Daejeon
World Short Track Speed Skating Championships medalists
21st-century South Korean people
Competitors at the 2023 Winter World University Games
Medalists at the 2023 Winter World University Games
Universiade medalists in short track speed skating
Universiade gold medalists for South Korea